Sabit Hadžić (7 August 1957 – 3 March 2018) was a Bosnian basketball player who competed for Yugoslavia in the 1984 Summer Olympics. He also worked as a basketball coach.

He died on 3 March 2018 after a reported stroke. He was 60.

References

1957 births
2018 deaths
Basketball players from Sarajevo
Bosnia and Herzegovina men's basketball players
Yugoslav men's basketball players
Olympic basketball players of Yugoslavia
Basketball players at the 1984 Summer Olympics
Olympic bronze medalists for Yugoslavia
Olympic medalists in basketball
Bosnia and Herzegovina basketball coaches
Medalists at the 1984 Summer Olympics
Mediterranean Games silver medalists for Yugoslavia
Mediterranean Games medalists in basketball
Competitors at the 1979 Mediterranean Games
KK Bosna Royal players